"Don't Play" is a song by English singer-songwriter Anne-Marie, British YouTuber and rapper KSI, and English DJ and record producer Digital Farm Animals. The song was written by the three artists alongside Mojam, Andrew Murray, S-X, Richard Boardman and Pablo Bowman, with Digital Farm Animals and Mojam handling the song's production. The song was released for digital download and streaming by Asylum Records and Warner Music Group on 15 January 2021 as the lead single from Anne-Marie's second studio album, Therapy (2021) and the second single from KSI's second studio album, All Over the Place (2021). The music video was released on 15 January 2021. 

"Don't Play" received positive reviews from music critics. The song debuted at number two on the UK Singles Chart and it has been certified platinum by the British Phonographic Industry (BPI) for exceeding sales of 600,000 units in the UK. The song additionally entered the music charts of Belgium, Croatia, the Czech Republic, Hungary, Ireland, Lithuania, the Netherlands, New Zealand, Romania, Sweden and the United States. "Don't Play" was nominated for the BRIT Award for Song of the Year at the 2022 ceremony.

Writing and production 
Speaking about collaborating with Anne-Marie, KSI said, "I was just gassed man. I heard the song and thought, 'Anne-Marie has absolutely made this a hit'. It was a good song but she made it insane. I was so gassed." Speaking about collaborating with KSI, Anne-Marie said, ""I am very open and honest and I try to be as down to earth as I can be all the time, but meeting JJ [KSI] opened my eyes even more. He is so real, it was very inspiring. He taught me to be myself and not to change myself for anyone. And his laugh is as crazy as mine. I was so happy about that." KSI and Anne-Marie confirmed shortly after the release of "Don't Play" that they had already started working on a second collaboration.

Music and lyrics 
Musically, "Don't Play" is a UK garage and pop track.  Constructed in verse–chorus form, the song runs for 3 minutes and 8 seconds (3:08).

In the song, Anne-Marie and KSI deliver emotive lyrics about heartache. Anne-Marie pleads with KSI to not play with her heart, before KSI responds with his own emotive out-pouring of how much he misses her, how much she means to him and how she's blanking him. The song is structured in an almost conversational arrangement.

Release and promotion 
On 4 January 2021, KSI shared a snippet of the instrumental to Twitter with the caption, "What female artist do you think would work well for this?" On 6 January 2021, he revealed via social media that the song is a collaboration with Anne-Marie and Digital Farm Animals, titled "Don't Play", and the song was made available for pre-order. "Don't Play" was released for digital download and streaming as a single on 15 January 2021 at 00:00 (UTC) by Asylum Records and Warner. The song was accompanied by the release of a lyric video to Anne-Marie's YouTube channel on the same day.

Critical reception 
"Don't Play" was met with positive reviews from music critics. Contact Music called "Don't Play" a "floor-filling banger" with "an infectious beat and some great vocal interplay between Anne-Marie and KSI". They found that Anne-Marie's "sweet harmonies contrast and compliment KSI's deeper, almost baritone delivery", and called the song "instantly likeable and radio friendly". GRM Daily's Courtney Wynter called Anne-Marie's vocals "delicate" and said that "KSI switches things up by delivering some affectionate lyrics with a more melodic approach than we’re used to". CelebMix's Katrina Rees said that the song "showcases Anne-Marie’s distinct vocals" and "KSI’s effortless flow", calling the song "uplifting" and a "low-key banger."

Music video 
The music video for "Don't Play" was directed by Troy Roscoe. The music video was filmed in London in mid-December 2020. The music video premiered on KSI's YouTube channel on 15 January 2021 at 10:00 (UTC).

The music video opens with Anne-Marie being bullied by a group of girls. In order to overcome the bullies and fight back, Anne-Marie is trained to fight by KSI. Anne-Marie becomes a fearless and take-no-prisoners fighter with a tough-girl mood, embodying the underdog narrative. The video pays homage to Anne-Marie’s background in Karate and KSI's participation in numerous boxing fights against other YouTubers. Anne-Marie revealed that she broke her finger during the music video shoot.

Four behind-the-scenes videos of the music video shoot have been released: the first video was released to Anne-Marie's YouTube channel on 16 January 2021; the second video was released to Digital Farm Animals' YouTube channel on 18 January 2021; the third video was released to KSI's YouTube channel on 19 January 2021, and the fourth video was released to Troy Roscoe's channel on 25 January 2021.

Commercial performance 
In the United Kingdom, "Don't Play" was the country's most downloaded song in its first week of release. It debuted at number two on the UK Singles Chart, making it the highest-placed new entry of that week, with first week sales of approximately 39,000 track-equivalent units. The song remained on the chart for a total of 27 weeks. On 24 September 2021, "Don't Play" was certified platinum by the British Phonographic Industry (BPI) for exceeding sales of 600,000 track-equivalent units in the UK/

In the Republic of Ireland, "Don't Play" debuted at number nine on the Irish Singles Chart, making it the highest-placed new entry of that week. It remained on the chart for a total of 23 weeks. In the United States, "Don't Play" debuted at number 12 on the Hot Dance/Electronic Songs chart. It was the country's 98th highest-selling dance track of 2021.

Awards and nominations

Credits and personnel 
Credits adapted from Tidal.

 Anne-Mariesongwriting, vocals
 KSIsongwriting, vocals
 Digital Farm Animalsbass, drums, keyboard, percussion, piano, production, songwriting, sound effects, strings, synthesizer
 Mojamdrums, keyboard, production, programming, songwriting, sound effects, synthesizer
 Andrew Murrayharp, live strings, songwriting
 Sam Gumbleyengineering, songwriting
 Richard Boardmansongwriting
 Pablo Bowmansongwriting
 Kevin Graingerengineering, mastering, mixing
Rob MacFarlaneengineering
 Cameron Gower Pooleengineering

Charts

Weekly charts

Year-end charts

Certifications

Release history

See also 
 List of UK top-ten singles in 2021
 List of UK Singles Downloads Chart number ones of the 2020s
 List of top 10 singles in 2021 (Ireland)

References

External links
 

2021 songs
2021 singles
Anne-Marie (singer) songs
KSI songs
Digital Farm Animals songs
Songs about heartache
Songs written by Anne-Marie (singer)
Songs written by KSI
Songs written by Digital Farm Animals
Songs written by Mustafa Omer
Songs written by Richard Boardman
Songs written by Pablo Bowman
Songs written by S-X
Song recordings produced by Digital Farm Animals
Song recordings produced by Mojam
Asylum Records singles
Warner Music Group singles
UK garage songs
Male–female vocal duets